Fígols i Alinyà is a municipality in the comarca of the Alt Urgell in Catalonia, Spain. It is situated on the left bank of the Segre river between Coll de Nargó and Organyà, just above the Oliana reservoir. The municipality was formed in 1972 by the merger of the municipalities of Fígols d'Organyà and Alinyà: the ajuntament (town hall) is in Fígols. A local road links the municipality with Organyà.

Subdivisions 
The municipality of Fígols i Alinyà is formed of five villages. Populations are given as of 2001:
Alinyà (70), on the road from Organyà to Bergà
L'Alzina d'Alinyà (29)
Canelles (6)
Fígols (152)
Perles (16)

Demography 
Population figures from before 1972 are the sum of the populations of Fígols d'Organyà and of Alinyà.

See also
Urgellet

References

 Panareda Clopés, Josep Maria; Rios Calvet, Jaume; Rabella Vives, Josep Maria (1989). Guia de Catalunya, Barcelona: Caixa de Catalunya.  (Spanish).  (Catalan).

External links
Official website 
 Government data pages 
Information - Consell comarcal 
Information - Diputació de Lleida  

Municipalities in Alt Urgell
Populated places in Alt Urgell